The 1976 Balkans Cup was an edition of the Balkans Cup, a football competition for representative clubs from the Balkan states. It was contested by 6 teams and Dinamo Zagreb won the trophy.

Group A

Group B

Finals

First leg

Second leg

Dinamo Zagreb won 5–4 on aggregate.

References

External links 

 RSSSF Archive → Balkans Cup
 
 Mehmet Çelik. "Balkan Cup". Turkish Soccer

1976
1975–76 in European football
1976–77 in European football
1975–76 in Romanian football
1976–77 in Romanian football
1975–76 in Greek football
1976–77 in Greek football
1975–76 in Bulgarian football
1976–77 in Bulgarian football
1975–76 in Turkish football
1976–77 in Turkish football
1975–76 in Yugoslav football
1976–77 in Yugoslav football
1975–76 in Albanian football
1976–77 in Albanian football